Thaneroclerus buquet is a species of checkered beetle in the family Thanerocleridae. It is found in Europe and Northern Asia (excluding China), North America, Oceania, and Southern Asia.

References

Further reading

 

Thanerocleridae
Articles created by Qbugbot
Beetles described in 1835